Hussain Sobah (born 11 November 1972) is a Maldivian film actor, music composer and playback singer.

Career
In 1995, Sobah featured in Mohamed Shiyaz's Dhushman alongside Mariyam Nisha, Aminath Rasheedha and Hamid Ali in pivotal roles. In the film, he plays the character Riyaz, an underprivileged young man who loses his girlfriend over social discrimination.

Hamid Ali's Badhal was released in 1996, in which he starred alongside Ali, Niuma Mohamed and Waleedha Waleed as a twin; a mentally challenged young man with an immature attitude. Sobah also appeared opposite Aishat Shirani in a Television Maldives production, Fun Asaru (1996) which follows two women; one searching for her mother and one fighting cancer. The following year, Sobah appeared alongside Mariyam Nisha and Jamsheedha Ahmed as a middle-class talented vocalist in Amjad Ibrahim's Loabeega Aniyaa. 

In 1998, Sobah starred opposite Mariyam Nisha and Jamsheedha Ahmed in Fathimath Nahula's debut direction Fahuneyvaa, which portrays the love-conflict of a man between a prominent stage performer and a deaf-mute poor girl. Sobah played the role of Ziyan Ali, a stage performer who marries a deaf-mute girl despite his family's disapproval. His performance and the film received critical appreciation from critics and was a commercial success.

The following year, he played the husband of the latter and a servant-turned-musician. This was followed by the Ali Musthafa-directed Umurah (1999) opposite Jamsheedha Ahmed and Reeko Moosa Manik. He next collaborated with Amjad Ibrahim for his comedy drama film Qurbaani (1999) starring opposite Mariyam Nisha and Yoosuf Shafeeu. The film was a financially successful project.

Sobah again collaborated with Amjad Ibrahim and Mariyam Nisha for the horror film Baaraige Fas (2009) where he produced and composed music for the song apart from starring as a news reporter. The film follows a temptress vampire who goes on a killing spree to quench her thirst. The film received mainly negative reviews from critics.

After a break of five years, Sobah appeared onscreen for the family drama film, Aadheys (2014) directed by Abdul Faththaah and starring Niuma Mohamed, Amira Ismail, Moosa Zakariyya, Fathimath Azifa and Ali Azim in pivotal roles. Filming was completed in 2011, though it was released three years later following the death of film producer Hassain Ali. It revolves around a sacrificing mother and her affection towards her child. Upon release, the film received mixed reviews from critics and failed to leave an impression commercially. Ismail Naail reviewing for Vaguthu wrote: "For a comeback, Sobah should have chosen another project. His performance is "bitter" and "unnatural". From the dialogue delivery to "over-expressive" hand movements, Sobah's acting is below-average at best".

Filmography

As an actor

Television

Discography

As a Singer

Selected discography as a composer

 Ainbehge Loabi Firiehge Vaajib (2000)
 Hiiy Edhenee (2001)
 Ginihila (2003)
 Kalaayaanulaa (2003)
 Vehey Vaarey Therein (2003)
 Dheke Dhekeves 2 (2005)
 Dheke Dhekeves 3 (2006)
 Dheke Dhekeves 4 (2006)
 Hukuru Vileyrey (2006)
 Udhabaani (2009)
 Hiyy Rohvaanulaa (2009)
 Dhin Veynuge Hithaamaigaa (2010)
 Heyonuvaane (2010)
 Hithey Dheymee (2011)
 Vee Beyvafa (2016)
 Nivairoalhi (2019)

Accolades

References

External links
 

People from Malé
21st-century Maldivian male actors
Maldivian male film actors
Living people
1972 births